Coreopsis is a genus of flowering plants in the family Asteraceae. Common names include calliopsis and tickseed, a name shared with various other plants.

Description
The flowers are usually yellow with a toothed tip, but may also be yellow-and-red bicolor. They have showy flower heads with involucral bracts in two distinct series of eight each, the outer being commonly connate at the base. The flat fruits are small and dry and look like insects.

There are 75–80 species of Coreopsis, all of which are native to North, Central, and South America. The name Coreopsis is derived from the Greek words κόρις (koris), meaning "bedbug", and ὄψις (opsis), meaning "view", referring to the shape of the achene.

Taxonomy
Coreopsis is a variable genus closely related to Bidens. In fact, neither Coreopsis nor Bidens, as defined in the 20th century, is strictly monophyletic. Coreopsis is best described as paraphyletic. Previously (1936), Coreopsis was classified into 11 sections and 114 species, but the African species were subsequently reclassified as Bidens, leaving the North and South American species, some 75–80 in all, under Coreopsis. 45 species are in the 11 North American sections, and the remaining 35 are in the South American section Pseudoagarista. The North American species fall into two broad groups, with 5 sections and 12 species in Mexico and North America and the remaining 5 sections and 26 species in Eastern North America.

One group which does seem to be monophyletic consists of temperate species from North America, including five sections of Coreopsis, Bidens coronata and Bidens tripartita, and the genus Thelesperma (five species).

Classification

Sections
One classification (GRIN) of the genus consists of eleven sections, shown by cladistic relationships with number of species in parenthesis.

Coreopsis sect. Pseudoagarista (35)

Selected species
See:

Section Anathysana 
 Coreopsis cyclocarpa S.F.Blake

Section Calliopsis 
 Coreopsis bicolor
 Coreopsis leavenworthii Torr. & A.Gray – Leavenworth's tickseed
 Coreopsis paludosa M.E.Jones
 Coreopsis tinctoria Nutt. – plains coreopsis

Section Coreopsis 
 Coreopsis auriculata L. – lobed tickseed
 Coreopsis bakeri E.E.Schill.
 Coreopsis basalis (A.Dietr.) S.F.Blake – goldenmane tickseed
 Coreopsis grandiflora Hogg ex Sweet – large-flowered tickseed
 Coreopsis intermedia Sherff – goldenwave tickseed
 Coreopsis lanceolata L. – lance coreopsis, lance-leaf tickseed
 Coreopsis nuecensis A.Heller – crown tickseed
 Coreopsis nuecensoides E.B.Sm. – Rio Grande tickseed
 Coreopsis pubescens Elliott – star tickseed
 Coreopsis wrightii (A.Gray) H.M.Parker – rock tickseed

Section Electra 
 Coreopsis cuneifolia Greenm.
 Coreopsis mexicana
 Coreopsis mutica DC.

Section Eublepharis 
 Coreopsis floridana E.B.Sm. – Florida tickseed
 Coreopsis gladiata Walter – coastalplain tickseed
 Coreopsis integrifolia Poir. – fringeleaf tickseed
 Coreopsis linifolia Nutt. – Texas tickseed
 Coreopsis nudata Nutt. – Georgia tickseed
 Coreopsis rosea Nutt. – pink tickseed

Section Gyrophyllum (syn. Palmatae) 
 Coreopsis delphiniifolia Lam. – larkspurleaf tickseed
 Coreopsis major Walter – greater tickseed
 Coreopsis palmata Nutt. – stiff tickseed
 Coreopsis pulchra F.E.Boynton – woodland tickseed
 Coreopsis tripteris L. – tall tickseed
 Coreopsis verticillata L. – whorled tickseed

Section Leptosyne 
 Coreopsis douglasii (DC.) H.M.Hall – Douglas's tickseed
 Coreopsis californica (Nutt.) H.Sharsm. – California tickseed
 Coreopsis stillmanii (A.Gray) S.F.Blake – Stillman's tickseed

Section Pseudoagarista 
South America, 35 species
 Coreopsis mcvaughii D.J.Crawford
 Coreopsis petrophila A.Gray
 Coreopsis petrophiloides B.L.Rob. & Greenm.
 Coreopsis rudis (Benth.) Hemsl.

Section Pugiopappus 
 Coreopsis bigelovii (A.Gray) Voss – Bigelow's tickseed
 Coreopsis calliopsidea (DC.) A.Gray – leafstem tickseed
 Coreopsis hamiltonii (Elmer) H. Sharsm. – Mount Hamilton tickseed

Section Silphidium 
 Coreopsis latifolia Michx. – broadleaf tickseed

Section Tuckermannia 
 Coreopsis gigantea (Kellogg) H.M.Hall – giant coreopsis
 Coreopsis maritima (Nutt.) Hook.f. – sea dahlia

Formerly placed here

Distribution and habitat
North American Coreopsis can be found in two habitats in the wild, growing along roadsides and open fields throughout the Eastern United States and Canada. In this environment the plant will self-sow.

Ecology
Coreopsis species are a source of nectar and pollen for insects. The species is known to provide food to caterpillars of some Lepidoptera species, including Coleophora acamtopappi.

Cultivation
Coreopsis can grow in a garden as a border plant, or in a container, preferring well-drained soil. Deadheading the flowers ensures it does not become weedy. Using the U.S. Department of Agriculture (USDA) hardiness zones will identify what soil and climate is preferred for different cultivars or species. Notable species found in cultivation are C. grandiflora and C. verticillata, as well as their various cultivars.
The sunny, summer-blooming, daisy-like flowers are popularly planted in gardens to attract butterflies. Both annual and perennial types are grown in the home garden (USDA hardiness zone 7a/6b). In the Mid-Atlantic region, insects such as bees, hover flies, and wasps are often observed visiting the flowers.

Culture 
All Coreopsis species were designated the state wildflower of the U.S. state of Florida in 1991. In the language of flowers, Coreopsis means to be always cheerful, while Coreopsis arkansa in particular stands for love at first sight.

References

External links
 Flora of North America: Coreopsis

 
Asteraceae genera
Symbols of Florida